Andrew Rostislavovich Pavlovsky is a contemporary Russian artist. He is a member of the Moscow Artists Union, the International Federation of Artists (IFA) and Russian Philosophical Union.

Biography 
From the nobles of South-Western land of the Russian Empire and the Don Military Nobles. Among his ancestors are: participants of the War of 1812, listed on the memorial  board of the Cathedral of Christ the Savior; Anatoly A. Linkov, a participant of the Ice March of the White Army (1918), (insignia 3543); and F.P. Kazantsev, the outstanding railway inventor and engineer.

Andrew Pavlovsky was greatly influenced by: Dmitry A. Shuvalov (1932-2013) - Russian honored artist, the professor of Leningrad Art and Industry College  named after Mukhina (nowadays – St.Petersburg  Art and Industry Academy) and Serafim A. Pavlovskiy (1903–1989), (namesake) the graduate of  VKHUTEMAS.

1984: Pavlovsky began his exhibitionary artistic career (painting). P. participated in a great variety of art exhibitions. Numerous paintings kept in private collections of Russia, Germany, USA, and Sweden.

1986: Pavlovsky undertook a position in design advertisement. Creative work in the field of advertisement design and exclusive representative polygraph productions. Cooperation/collaborated with: the Central Committee of the LYCLSU (Leninist Young Communist League of the Soviet Union), the Stas Namin Music Center (SNC), the publishing houses «Raduga», All Union Record Studio «Melodiya», the Central State Concert Hall «Rossiya», Mosconcert, Moscow State Philarmony, «MiG» corporation, VNPO «ELEKTRONIKA» etc... Designer of the contest of «Moscow beauty», the author of numerous commercial advertisements and representative posters of the show business stars and rising actors and singers.  
During the Perestroika period worked as the director of several advertising agencies: JUPITER (USSR- Hong Kong Joint venture) and SODRUZHESTVO (USSR-USA Joint venture) combining the work of the art-consultant and art-designer. 
Post-soviet times: P. had worked for RF Government Administration. State Department of Economic Development and Trade of RF, the Russian version of magazines ELLE, ELLE-Decor, Moulin ROUGE, ANTOURAGE, MEZZANINE, Russian Information Agency «NEWS». P. designed advertisements for such events as «Moscow days» in Warsaw, Prague, Madrid, Budapest (director and producer Sergey Vinnikov) and Vienna. 
P. was a producer of artistic-expositional projects (the latest producer’s project – «The portrait of science in centuries. Moisey Nappelbaum, Alexander Marov», St. Petersburg State Photography Center, 2007).
1987–1990 – P. had been teaching at the Studio of the visual perception esthetics «Studio A» where he had introduced a methodology to train a «Viewer».
2002 – Organizer and Chief artist of the creative association M’ART Group.

Aesthetics 
The main field of activity is graphic design. P. is the representative of the transitional (soviet - post-soviet) artistic generation. He had made a contribution to form esthetics of modern Russian design in advertising-representative and advertising-publishing production. P.’s design could be distinguished as precise, conscientious, highly thought off and well-grounded. There are reconsidered and actualized elements of Russian constructivism in the basis of his esthetic conception. P. had introduced new term – Additive Constructivism. P. is the author of works that had become the characteristic examples of commercial posters and graphic design of the last twenty years (many of them are kept in the Russian State Library).

Projects 
Russia – the Planet of Space, M.: Publishing House: RIA «News» (RIAN), 2002. Client: Russian Government Administration (producers: Alexey Volin, Kuzma Mikhailov). 50 000 copies in five languages;
Deluxe Album edition Department of the Economic Development and Trade. 1802-2002, M.: Publishing house: RIA «News», 2002. Client: Department of the Economic Development and Trade of the Russian Federation. 10 000 copies;
 CHECHNYA. Questions & Answers, M.: Publishing house – RIA «News» (RIAN) 2003. Client – RF President Administration. Total circulation quantity –12 000 copies in six languages;
 Russian Booker, Prize Chief Advertisement Designer 2004 (2005). Client: «Open Russia – Russian Booker»;
 We will recall this sometimes, M.: Publishing house: Department of the Economic Development and Trade of the Russian Federation, 2005. Client: Department of the Economic Development and Trade of the Russian Federation. 5000 copies;
United Technologies in Russia 2002–2006. M.: UTIO. Client: UT International Operations (producer – Natalia Sorokina), 10 000 copies (four editions at two languages);

Promotional posters for Lora Kvint, Alla Pugacheva, Brigada S, RONDO, Korroziya Metalla, Scorpions (coupled with GP), etc. Regular publications of advertisements in magazines ELLE, ELLE-Decor, AD, MEZZANINE, Moulin ROUGE (Russian Editions).

Painting 
The artist began as a painter. Painting gives him space for rest from modern design creative conflicts and serves as a platform for research in the field of color, proportions, and composition. It helps him to create the fundamentals (basis) of Andrey Pavlovsky design. The artist sticks to the Russian aesthetic tradition of the 20th century. He successfully projects it into his modern design works and paintings. He doesn’t have a large number of paintings though all of them burst with love for color and respect to the masters of the past.

Additional information 
P. is the honored member of the Association of Biographic Researches WHO IS WHO with the presentation of the insignia (ZVR# 346 892 533) and certification for its bearing (RU02005850).

Sources 

2002-2007

 ANTOURAGE. Magazin. Publishing House Antourage XXI, registration 018740-99, 30000 copies, #12, Page 051.
 DOROGOY ZHURNAL. Publishing House Moskovskie novosti, registration 018589, 10000 copies, winter 2002/2003(Inlay).
 MODNOE BELJE. Magazine, registration PI 77-17065, 25700 copies, August/September 2004(BackCover).
 BRIDE. Magazine, Publishing House Everest + ALAFOLIE Paris, registration PI 77-4457, 20000 copies, November/December 2001, page 61.
 MOULIN ROUGE. Magazine, Rodionov Publishing House + EMAP FRANCE, registration PI 77-12587, 80000 copies, October 2004, page 3; May 2006 (Inlay).
 ELLE DÉCOR. Magazine, Russian edition, COMPAGNIE INTERNATIONALE DE PRESS ET DE PUBLICITE S.A.M., registration PI -777508, 70000 copies, Number 1, page 31.
 МВ. Magazine, MIGENTA, registration PI -775301, 60000 copies, March 2002, third cover page; December 2002, page 87; April 2004 (Inlay).
 MEZZANINE. Magazine, PARLANT, registration 015924, 50000 copies, 2001, N3, page 37.
 WATCH BUSINESS. Magazine, In Chаs Publishing House, registration PI 77-1451, 5000 copies, 2001, N4, page 18; N5, page 3.
 OPTIMUM. Magazine, Le Magazine de L'Optimum, Rodionov Publishing House Under the license Les Editions Jalou, registration PI -77-17399, 70000 copies, October 2004, page 23.
 WHO IS WHO в РОССИИ. — The International Business Who is Who Corp (Panama), Who is Who, «Verlag für Personenenzyklopädien AG'» (Switzerland), 2008 / 2009. —

See also
 List of Russian artists

Russian graphic designers
20th-century Russian painters
Russian male painters
21st-century Russian painters
1962 births
Artists from Moscow
Living people
20th-century Russian male artists
21st-century Russian male artists